Jacques Joseph Victor Higelin (18 October 1940 – 6 April 2018) was a French pop singer who rose to prominence in the early 1970s.

Early life
Higelin was born on 18 October 1940. His father, Paul, a railway worker and musician of Alsatian descent, introduced his two sons to various forms of music, while his mother, Renée, of Belgian descent, raised them both.

Career

Higelin's entertainment career began at age 14, when he left school to work as a stunt double. While playing a number of minor roles in motion pictures, Higelin was taught to play the guitar by Henri Crolla, a French-Italian jazz guitarist and a composer of film scores. By the early 1960s, Higelin was attending the René Simon drama school, where he won the François Perier award.

For two years beginning in 1961, Higelin served in the French military in various countries. Upon returning to France, he resumed his film career but increasingly began to focus on music. By the end of the decade, he had become very active in the artistic underground in Paris and began to channel his music towards radical activism.

Higelin began attracting popular attention through his live concerts, typically held in smaller venues, and released his first solo album in 1971. By the middle of the 1970s, Higelin had become one of France's most successful pop musicians, and he remains influential to this day.

In the 70's Higelin was in a relationship with a French-Vietnamese woman called Kuelan Nguyen. She accompanied him during the recording of an album at Château d'Hérouville Studio, where Iggy Pop was also recording his debut solo album "The Idiot". Iggy Pop became infatuated with Nguyen, who rejected him, but the incident inspired the song China Girl, which later became a hit when re-recorded by David Bowie.

Personal life and death
Higelin had three children, all of whom became artists:
Arthur H, singer, born to Nicole Courtois in 1966
Kên Higelin, actor, born to Kuelan Nguyen in 1972
Izïa, singer, born to dancer Aziza Zakine in 1990. Higelin married Zakine in 2011.

Higelin died on 6 April 2018 in Paris.

Discography

Albums
Studio albums (non-charting)
1971 – Jacques "Crabouif" Higelin
1976 – Irradié
1976 – Alertez les bébés !
1978 – No Man's Land
1979 – Champagne pour tout le monde, and Caviar pour les autres... (also released as a double album under the title Champagne et Caviar, currently the standard edition)
1980 – La Bande du Rex
1982 – Higelin 82
1985 – Aï (double album)
1988 – Tombé du ciel
1991 – Illicite
1994 – Aux héros de la voltige
1998 – Paradis paien
2005 – Jacque Higelin chante Vian et Higelin
2006 – Amor Doloroso
2010 – Coup de foudre
2013 – Beau Repaire

Studio albums (charting)

Live albums (non-charting)
1981: Higelin à Mogador (triple album, 2 CDs)
1983: Casino de Paris (1 album, 1 CD)
1986: Higelin à Bercy (triple album, 2 CD)
1990: Follow the Live (double album, 1 CD)
1992: Higelin Le Rex (double album, 1 CD)

Live albums (charting)

Albums with Brigitte Fontaine
1966: 12 chansons d'avant le déluge
1976: 15 chansons d'avant le déluge, suite et fin

Album with Areski Belkacem
1969: Higelin et Areski

Compilations
1973 – Jacques Canetti présente Jacques Higelin
1980 – Inédits 1970
2005 – Entre deux gares

Filmography
2004 : Colette, une femme libre, directed by Nadine Trintignant (TV Mini-Series)

References

External links

RFI Biography – Jacques Higelin 
Europop Music – Jacques Higelin (English)

1940 births
2018 deaths
People from Seine-et-Marne
French male singers
French pop singers
French male film actors
French people of Belgian descent
Commandeurs of the Ordre des Arts et des Lettres
Pathé-Marconi artists
Burials at Père Lachaise Cemetery